Kiryandongo District is a district in Western Uganda. Like many other Ugandan districts, it is named after its 'chief town', Kiryandongo, where the district headquarters are located.

Location

Kiryandongo District is bordered by Nwoya District to the north, Oyam District to the northeast, Apac District to the east, and Masindi District to the south and west. The coordinates of the district are:02 00N, 32 18E (Latitude:2.0000; Longitude:32.3000).

Overview
Kiryandongo District was established on 1 July 2010. Prior to that, it was part of Masindi District. The district is part of Bunyoro sub-region, which is coterminous with Bunyoro Kingdom. The districts that constitute Bunyoro sub-region include the following: 1. Buliisa District 2. Hoima District 3. Kibaale District 4. Kiryandongo District and 5. Masindi District. In 2002, the sub-region was home to an estimated 750,000 inhabitants, according to the national population and household census conducted that year.

Population
The 1991 Uganda national census estimated the district population at about 83,405. According to the 2002 national census, that population had increased to about 187,700. In 2012, the population of Kiryandongo District was estimated at about 317,500. A new national census is planned for August 2014.

See also
 Kiryandongo
 Karuma Power Station
 Bunyoro sub-region
 Western Region, Uganda
 Districts of Uganda

References

External links
  Kiryandongo District Homepage

 
Bunyoro sub-region
Districts of Uganda
Western Region, Uganda